Bek Nelson (born Doris Dee Stiner; March 8, 1927 – March 28, 2015) was an American model and showgirl who turned to acting at age 29, making seven films and two dozen television shows in her first three years.

Early life
She was born Doris Dee Stiner in Goin, Tennessee. Her parents were Ralph Stiner and Mae Cole Stiner. She had four younger brothers and a younger sister.

The family moved from Tennessee to Canton, Ohio, when Stiner was 18 months old. Her father worked as a metal sander and then later as an inspector for Timken Roller Bearing Company. At age 10, Stiner won a "Cutest Child" contest. She attended Lincoln High School from 1941 thru 1945. While in high school, she was active in dramatics, chorus, and student government, and had roles in the junior- and senior-class plays.

New York
After graduation, Stiner and a girlfriend moved to New York City, where Stiner found work as a Powers model. Her specialty was modeling swimsuits, for which she became well-known through newspaper photos and ads. She first lived in Manhattan, then moved to Newark, New Jersey, as her swimsuit career built up. She won a number of small, local beauty contests, which again brought her newspaper publicity. She also served as a model for publicizing events and trade shows.

By 1951, however, she decided to take on a regular performing gig as a dancer with the Copacabana chorus line. Her first night was a disaster, as the presence of the audience rattled her. She credited the nightclub's manager for her recovery:
I went completely to pieces when I saw the audience, but Mr. Entratter, an understanding man, told me to sit at a table and watch the show. The next night I went on and performed like a pro, otherwise my career would have ended before it began.   
Stiner did well enough to hold her job for two years. While at the Copacabana, comic strip artist Milton Caniff picked her out to be his model for the character Miss Mizzou in Steve Canyon. Years later, the Knoxville Journal ran an old photo of her posing for Caniff, with a large sketch of the character and the artist's hands and distinctive signature visible in the foreground.

In 1953, new owners took over the Copacabana, and Entratter left to be general manager of the Sands Hotel. Stiner and four other Copacabana dancers were let go, and all five decided to follow Entratter to Las Vegas to be showgirls. Entratter billed them as the "CopaGirls", using them for publicity that  encouraged other young women to try out for a contest to become a CopaGirl at $150 a week.

Columbia contract
Stiner was at the Sands for at least three years. According to her later recounting with interviewers, she was performing there when Cinerama filmed the floor show.  A talent scout for Columbia Pictures saw the film, noticed her, and signed her to a contract with that studio. However, her first work with Columbia, filming Pal Joey, did not start until April 1957, while newspaper photos from one year earlier show her doing a modeling assignment in Los Angeles as "Bek Nelson". This is the earliest verifiable use of her stage name. Columnist Lowell E. Redelings said "there's quite a story to how she got that unusual first name", but didn't see fit to share it with his readers.

Bek Nelson appeared on camera for an episode of a ZIV-produced television program, Science Fiction Theatre, which was first broadcast in August 1956. She had no lines and the two-minute part was uncredited, but it clearly establishes that her screen debut came prior to her contract with Columbia. She also did TV commercials prior to being signed by Columbia.

While filming Pal Joey during April and May 1957, Bek was used for an uncredited bit as a nurse in Operation Mad Ball, which was also in production on the Columbia lot. She then co-starred in a Columbia comedy short Tricky Chicks with Muriel Landers, playing nightclub hostesses suspected of being foreign agents. According to columnist Hedda Hopper, Columbia head Harry Cohn was "giving Bek Nelson a big, big build-up."

Cohn had Columbia cast her in four more films made in 1957, to be released in 1958. She had a small, uncredited part as a dance-hall girl in Cowboy, then a feature role as a stewardess in the disaster film Crash Landing. Bek told the Knoxville Journal that the ocean rescue scene was filmed at the studio lake, with the director requesting "Please don't anyone stand up in the water... we don't want anyone to know our ocean is only three feet deep." Next came another comedy short, with The Three Stooges in Flying Saucer Daffy. Finally, she went back to an uncredited dance-hall girl bit in Gunman's Walk

Bek's next film for Columbia, Bell, Book and Candle, was made and released in 1958. It was also her last film; Harry Cohn died of a heart attack at the end of February that year. His successors let her contract finish up in 1958 with lending her out for television shows.

Television 1957-1966
When she was not making films, Columbia lent Bek out to television production companies, including the associated Screen Gems. As 1957 was top-heavy with film work, she did only two TV programs that year, but 1958 had her doing 15 episodes, a large number for anyone not playing a series regular. Included among these were 9 episodes of the ABC series Lawman, where she had a recurring role as a widowed restaurant owner. Columnist Jack Gaver mused, "It is difficult to decide which name is odder -- Bek Nelson or Dru Lemp. The former plays the latter ..." An unknown TV Key Mailbag editor found the name confusing. A letter writer asked who played the mean guy, "tall, with strange eyes, and an unusual face" on "The Deputy" episode of Lawman. The editor replied, "the villain on that show was an actor named Bek Nelson".

By 1959, Bek Nelson was an independent actress, represented by the Harold L. Gefesky Agency, with whom she remained throughout her show-business career. Once again she appeared on 15 episodes of shows, including another small recurring bit on four episodes of The Third Man. Guest star, feature player, and bit part were all represented in her resume of parts that year, and for years to come. She had no professional vanity about her billing status, but like other television actresses of the time, found doing Westerns to be limiting.
A girl in a television horse opera can be typed as a dance-hall hostess, a rancher's wife, a rancher's daughter, a gambling-hall queen, or a gal from the East visiting the rugged West. And the last choice is that of the frontier town's restaurant owner, which I currently fill. 
For 1960 and 1961, the number of television roles she accepted were reduced to half or less of previous years. She was married now, her husband had a successful acting career, and they were hoping to start a family. Subsequent years had her sometimes do only two shows a year. Her career did pick up some in 1964 and 1965; she had a small part in her husband's award-winning indie film The Lollipop Cover and a brief recurring role on Peyton Place, for most episodes of which she was shown just talking on the phone, without directly interacting with the other actors. Her final acting job was a pro bono bit in 1966 for Insight, a syndicated show usually shown on Sundays.

Personal life
According to an article in TV Guide, Bek was married shortly after moving to New York in 1945, with the marriage being annulled.

Reporting the aftermath of a fire in Laurel Canyon during July 1959, the Los Angeles Times cited a Mrs. Bek Nelson Gordon as saying several houses near hers on Willow Glen Road had been lost. However, actor Don Gordon and Bek Nelson did not take out a marriage license until much later. They were married under her birth name on December 31, 1959, in Los Angeles. At that time, a cohabitating single actress could suffer a serious career setback if the situation became widely known.

This was Gordon's third marriage and Bek's second. Gordon told an interviewer in October 1960, "she doesn't want to be an actress, and I'm glad. I think women should stay home, keep house, and have babies." Bek evidently agreed, for she stopped acting after the couple adopted a daughter in 1966. The couple remained married for 20 years, divorcing in 1979.

Filmography

Notes

References

1927 births
2015 deaths
Female models from Tennessee
Actresses from Tennessee